Donato da Formello (c. 1550–c. 1580), sometimes known as Donato Palmieri, was an Italian painter of the late Renaissance period. He was a native of Formello, in the duchy of Bracciano. He worked under Giorgio Vasari in projects in the Vatican and Florence. According to Baglione, he visited Rome early in the pontificate of Gregory XIII. He greatly surpassed the style of his instructor, as is evident in his fresco works on a staircase in the Vatican, representing subjects from the life of St. Peter. He died about 1580.

External links

Baglione, Giovanni Le Vite de’ Pittori, Scultori et Architetti. Dal Pontificato di Gregorio XII del 1572 in fino a’ tempi di Papa Urbano VIII nel 1642, p. 15
 

16th-century Italian painters
Italian male painters
Italian Renaissance painters
1550s births
1580s deaths
People from the Metropolitan City of Rome Capital